The name Chuck has been used for two tropical cyclones in the western Pacific Ocean.

 Typhoon Chuck (1992) (T9204, 03W, Biring), made landfall on Hainan and in northern Vietnam
 Tropical Storm Chuck (1995) (T9501, 02W), remained out to sea

Pacific typhoon set index articles